"Gone Too Far" is a song co-written and recorded by American country music artist Eddie Rabbitt. It was released in February 1980 as the third single from the album Loveline. The song was Rabbitt's sixth number one on the country chart. The single stayed at number one for a single week and spent a total of ten weeks on the country chart.  It was written by Rabbitt, Even Stevens and David Malloy.

Charts

Weekly charts

Year-end charts

References

Eddie Rabbitt songs
1979 songs
1980 singles
Songs written by David Malloy
Songs written by Eddie Rabbitt
Songs written by Even Stevens (songwriter)
Song recordings produced by David Malloy
Elektra Records singles